Shinkbalakada (Dargwa: Шинкьбалакъада) is a rural locality (a selo) in Dubrimakhinsky Selsoviet, Akushinsky District, Republic of Dagestan, Russia. The population was 306 as of 2010.

Geography 
Shinkbalakada is located 6 km southeast of Akusha (the district's administrative centre) by road, on the Inki River. Kamkadamakhi is the nearest rural locality.

References 

Rural localities in Akushinsky District